Ornipholidotos onitshae, the Onitsha glasswing, is a butterfly in the family Lycaenidae. It is found in Sierra Leone, Ivory Coast, Ghana, southern Nigeria and western Cameroon. The habitat consists of forests.

References

Butterflies described in 1962
Ornipholidotos